Dorothy Elsie Knowles,  (born April 6, 1927) is a Canadian artist, most notable for her landscape paintings. She is the widow of William Perehudoff, a fellow artist who is closely associated with the Color Field movement.

Career
Knowles studied with Eli Bornstein at the University of Saskatchewan and she went on to study at the Goldsmith School of Art in London and Banff Centre. She was influenced by her studies at the Emma Lake Artists' Workshops. She is known for her often large perceptual landscape paintings and has had exhibitions across Canada and the United States.

Dorothy Knowles was inducted into the Saskatchewan Order of Merit in 1987, and became a Member of the Order of Canada in 2004. She was made a member of the Royal Canadian Academy of Arts.

Two postage stamps depicting paintings by Knowles, The Field of Rapeseed (1971) and North Saskatchewan River (1971) were issued by Canada Post on April 7, 2006.

References

External links 
 Dorothy Knowles: Land Marks https://web.archive.org/web/20170203175809/http://www.mcmichael.com/exhibitions/dorothyknowles/past.cfm
 VISUAL HEARTS: William Perehudoff and Dorothy Knowles, August 31, 2003. http://www.gallerieswest.ca/artists/previews/visual-hearts%3A-william-perehudoff-and-dorothy-knowles/
 MacKenzie Art Gallery. http://www.mackenzieartgallery.ca/engage/exhibitions/dorothy-knowles-watercolour-portraits-of-saskatchewan
 Black, Lauren. "KNOWLES, DOROTHY (1927–)" http://esask.uregina.ca/entry/knowles_dorothy_1927-.html

1927 births
Living people
Members of the Order of Canada
20th-century Canadian painters
21st-century Canadian painters
Members of the Saskatchewan Order of Merit
Members of the Royal Canadian Academy of Arts
20th-century Canadian women artists
21st-century Canadian women artists